The Atna Range is a small subrange of the Skeena Mountains of the Interior Mountains, located in northern British Columbia, Canada.

References

"Atna Range". Canadian Mountain Encyclopedia. Bivouac.com.

Skeena Mountains